Eamonn Brophy (born 10 March 1996) is a Scottish professional footballer who plays for Ross County, on loan from St Mirren, as a striker.

Brophy has previously played for Celtic, Hibernian, Hamilton Academical, Queen's Park, Dumbarton and Kilmarnock, and made his senior international debut for Scotland in 2019.

Club career
Brophy is a product of the Celtic and Hibernian youth systems, but both considered him too short at the time. He turned professional with Hamilton Academical in July 2012. He made his senior debut on 9 April 2013, scoring a goal in the process.

On 6 March 2014, Brophy signed for Scottish League Two club Queen's Park on loan until the end of the 2013–14 season. He made his debut for the club on 8 March 2014, scoring in a 3–1 defeat against Clyde.

He joined Scottish Championship outfit Dumbarton on loan in September 2015.

On 18 August 2017, Brophy signed for Kilmarnock, on a three-year contract. On the last day of the 2018–19 season, Brophy's 89th-minute penalty saw Kilmarnock beat Rangers 2–1 to seal a place in the 2019–20 UEFA Europa League – the first time the club had qualified for a European competition since the 2001–02 UEFA Cup.

Brophy signed a pre-contract agreement with St Mirren in January 2021 to transfer in the summer, although St Mirren were hoping to sign him that month instead. Kilmarnock manager Alex Dyer said that he "probably" wouldn't select Brophy again, as the player wanted to leave the club. Brophy was loaned to St Mirren for the rest of the 2020–21 season, filling the period before his permanent move.

In January 2023 he moved on loan to Ross County.

International career
Brophy has played for Scotland at under-19 level. He was selected for the under-21 squad for the first time in October 2016, for a friendly match against Slovakia, in which he made his debut as Scotland lost 4–0 on 9 November 2016.

He received his first call-up to the Scotland senior national team for UEFA Euro 2020 qualifying fixtures in May 2019. He made his senior debut on 8 June 2019 in a 2–1 victory against Cyprus at Hampden Park.

Career statistics

References

1996 births
Living people
Scottish footballers
Celtic F.C. players
Hibernian F.C. players
Hamilton Academical F.C. players
Dumbarton F.C. players
Queen's Park F.C. players
Kilmarnock F.C. players
Scottish Football League players
Association football forwards
Scottish Professional Football League players
Scotland youth international footballers
Scotland under-21 international footballers
Scotland international footballers
St Mirren F.C. players
Ross County F.C. players